The Marin County Department of Parks and Open Space, consisting of the Marin County Parks and Landscape Division and the Marin County Open Space District, is a parks governing body in Marin County, California overseen by the Marin County Board of Supervisors. The current director and general manager is Max Korten.

Parks
McInnis Park, in San Rafael
McNears Beach Park, on San Pablo Bay
Paradise Beach Park, on the Tiburon peninsula
Stafford Lake Park	 	 
Agate Beach, near Bolinas, and part of the Duxbury Reef State Marine Conservation Area 
Upton Beach, at Stinson Beach

Open space
Alto Bowl
Bald Hill
Baltimore Canyon
Blithedale Summit
Bolinas Lagoon
Bothin Marsh
Camino Alto
Cascade Canyon
Deer Island
French Ranch
Gary Giacomini
Horse Hill
Ignacio Valley
Indian Tree
Indian Valley
King Mountain
Little Mountain
Loma Alta
Loma Verde
Lucas Valley
Maurice Thorner Memorial
Mount Burdell
Old Saint Hilary's
Pacheco Valle
Ring Mountain
Roy's Redwoods
Rush Creek
San Pedro Mountain
Santa Margarita Island
Santa Venetia Marsh
Terra Linda / Sleepy Hollow
Tiburon Ridge
Verissimo Hills
White Hill

References

External links
official website
County government agencies in California
County parks departments in the United States
Park districts in California
Protected areas of Marin County, California